Mercury (promoted as Modern Visual Basic) is a programming language developed by RemObjects Software. RemObjects extends VB.Net underlying language and plans to add more features to it.

Mercury is a commercial product and is the sixth language supported by  RemObjects Elements Compiler toolchain, next to C#, Swift, Java, Go and Oxygene. It integrates with Microsoft's Visual Studio on Windows, as well as  RemObjects Elements IDE called Water on Windows and Fire on macOS.

References 

Programming languages